Jakers! The Adventures of Piggley Winks is a children's television series, animated using computer-generated imagery and broadcast in the United States, United Kingdom, Ireland, Australia, Canada, and Latin America.

Series overview

Episodes

Season 1 (2003–04)

Season 2 (2004–05)

Season 3 (2006–07)

References

External links
 TV.com

Lists of American children's animated television series episodes
Lists of British animated television series episodes